In thermodynamics, the enthalpy of sublimation, or heat of sublimation, is the heat required to sublimate (change from solid to gas) one mole of a substance at a given combination of temperature and pressure, usually standard temperature and pressure (STP). It is equal to the cohesive energy of the solid. For elemental metals, it is also equal to the standard enthalpy of formation of the gaseous metal atoms. The heat of sublimation is usually expressed in kJ/mol, although the less customary kJ/kg is also encountered.

Sublimation enthalpies

See also
 Heat
 Sublimation (chemistry) 
 Phase transition
 Clausius-Clapeyron equation

References 

Enthalpy